DFCU may refer to:

 DFCU Group, a Ugandan financial services company involved in retail banking, mortgage lending, development finance, leasing, as well as commercial real estate investments
 DFCU Bank, a commercial bank in Uganda; a subsidiary of DFCU Group
 Digital Federal Credit Union, a credit union in Massachusetts
 DFCU Financial, a credit union in Michigan